John Duncan "Red" Barkley (September 19, 1912 – December 12, 2000) was a backup infielder in Major League Baseball (MLB) who played for the St. Louis Browns, the Boston Bees and the Brooklyn Dodgers. In a three-season career, Barkley was a .264 hitter with no home runs and 21 runs batted in in 63 games played. He is the grandfather of Brian Barkley, who pitched with the Boston Red Sox.

Barkley died in Waco, Texas, at the age of 88.

External links

Boston Bees players
Brooklyn Dodgers players
St. Louis Browns players
Major League Baseball infielders
1912 births
2000 deaths
Major League Baseball second basemen
Major League Baseball shortstops
Minor league baseball managers
Danville Leafs players
Meridian Scrappers players
Springfield Browns players
Evansville Bees players
San Antonio Missions players
Montreal Royals players
Waco Dons players
Baseball players from Texas
People from Childress, Texas
St. Louis Cardinals scouts